This is a list of the European Hot 100 Singles and European Top 100 Albums number ones of 2007, as published by Billboard magazine.

Chart history

References

Europe
2007
2007